, is a Japanese media personality based in Indonesia. She is a former member of the Japanese idol group AKB48 and its sub-unit Watarirouka Hashiritai, as well as its Indonesian sister group JKT48, all produced by Yasushi Akimoto.

Career 
At the age of 14, Nakagawa participated in an audition for the addition of a 3rd Generation AKB48 member, and was accepted on 3 December 2006 as an AKB48 Team B. In October 2008, she was placed into a sub-unit named Okashina Sisters of AKB48 which is then renamed to Watarirouka Hashiritai with Ota Aika and Watanabe Mayu her fellow 3rd generation colleagues.

After the night of the 135th anniversary of Yomiuri Shimbun AKB 104 Senbatsu Member Sokaku Matsuri, 23 August 2009, the AKB48 personnel overhaul was announced. Nakagawa was promoted to AKB48's Team A since October 2009 and started going upstage as a member of Team A since 27 July 2010. On 24 August 2012, the first day of its Tokyo Dome concert series, AKB48 announced a reorganization of its teams. Nakagawa and Aki Takajo were sent to Jakarta to help AKB48's sister group, JKT48.

As the new AKB48 formation began on 1 November 2012, Nakagawa was officially transferred to JKT48 since that date. The Diversified Events on RCTI on 9 December 2012 was her first appearance as a member of JKT48. At JKT48's 1st anniversary concert in Gelora Bung Karno Sports Complex on 23 December 2012, Nakagawa was included in Team J together with Takajo and all of the 22 surviving first generation members of JKT48. Nakagawa performed with Team J on the first day of Renai Kinshi Jourei performance at JKT48 Theater on 26 December 2012.

Within a year, Nakagawa has appeared in about 20+ TV commercials and several TV dramas in Indonesia. She also got the center position for  JKT48's "Fortune Cookie Yang Mencinta" (Koisuru Fortune Cookie 恋するフォーチュンクッキー, "The Fall-in-Love Fortune Cookie") MV that was released on 21 August 2013. Nakagawa also showed the other side of herself as a senior member of AKB48 by teaching and guiding her fellow JKT48 colleagues. Her hard effort has made her accepted, famous and loved in the society.

On 9 February 2014, AKB48's sub-unit Watarirouka Hashiritai held their last concert and the sub-group finally broke up. On 28 December 2014, she joined a new sub-unit of JKT48 named 4 Gulali and is the first sub-group from JKT48 that was formed. Previously, the officials asked the fans for help to contribute by giving ideas of what will become the project's name with the #NAMAHARUKAPROJECT (Haruka's Project Name) tag on Twitter. Members and costumes for the group were determined and decided by Nakagawa herself. They successfully performed their single "Chu Chu Chu Only For You" (Kimi Dake ni Chu! Chu! Chu!) And "Be Yourself" (Jibun Rashisa) at JKT48 3rd Anniversary at Tennis Indoor Senayan, Saturday 27 December 2014.

At the JKT48 Concert Show Hour Setlist Best 30 2016 held on 27 February 2016 at Balai Sarbini, Jakarta, Nakagawa announced her graduation from JKT48. Not only graduating from JKT48, because Nakagawa did not want to go back to Japan after graduating from JKT48, she also decided to graduate from the 48 Group. Nakagawa had a farewell concert in Surabaya on 3 June 2016. In a concert titled "Wayahe Suroboyo, Rek!" Nakagawa has also given a special gift, which is cycling for 800 km from Jakarta to Surabaya from 23 May to 3 June 2016. For that, she were crowned the title, "Sang Legenda JKT48" (The Legend of JKT48). On 17 December 2016, Nakagawa held her graduation concert as well as the 5th anniversary of JKT48 at Trans Luxury Convention Center in Bandung, West Java. On 30 December 2016, Nakagawa held her graduation performance on the old Team T's side "Holding My Hand" and a new Team J until she was graduated from JKT48. She then also received another title as "Senior JKT48" (JKT48's senior).

After graduating from JKT48, since early January 2017, Nakagawa started her solo career as an talent and actress under the management of dentsuXentertainment.

She is named one of the Top 10 "Most Influential Women on Twitter" in 2016 and 2017 by the social media analytics firm Brandwatch, placing above Britney Spears, Oprah Winfrey and Alicia Keys. She is the only Japanese person in the list.

In 2018, she is appointed as an ambassador of the "Commemoration of 60 Years of Diplomatic Relations between Japan – Indonesia" and also the ambassador of Goodwill between the two countries.

She is now famous both in Japan and Indonesia, and is also touted as the most famous Japanese in Indonesia in the modern era.

Personal life 
On her 27th birthday, Nakagawa revealed on her Instagram account that her parents divorced when she was very young and she and her siblings used to live with their grandmother, and that she has lost contact with her mother.

Her sister passed away on 4 May 2019 at the age of 28.

On 5 March 2020 Nakagawa revealed that she was raised in foster care, and had previously lied about her upbringing due to fears it would negatively impact her career.

Idol groups 

AKB48 (2006–2012)
JKT48 (2012–2016)

Sub-unit 
Watarirouka Hashiritai (AKB48) (2008–2014)
4 Gulali (JKT48) (2014–2016)

Discography

JKT48 A-sides

JKT48 B-sides

AKB48 A-sides 
Heavy Rotation
Chance no Junban

AKB48 B-sides

Watarirouka Hashiritai 7 A-sides

Watarirouka Hashiritai 7 B-sides

4 Gulali

JKT48 albums

AKB48 albums

Watarirouka Hashiritai albums 
Rouka wa Hashiruna!
Watarirouka wo Yukkuri Arukitai

Stage Units 
B1 (Seishun Girls)

Fushidara na Natsu

B2 (Aitakatta)

Glass no I LOVE YOU

Senaka Kara Dakishimete

B3 (Pajama Drive)

Pajama Drive

B4 (Idol no Yoake)

Tengoku Yarou

A6 (Mokugekisha)

Saboten to Gold Rush

RS1 (Pajama Drive)

Junjou Shugi (Revival)

Temodemo no Namida (Revival)

J1 (Renai Kinshi Jourei)

Heart Gata Virus

J2 (Dareka no Tame ni)

Shinkirou

Seifuku ga Jama wo Suru

Surprise Stage (Boku no Taiyou)

Higurashi no Koi

J3 (Theater no Megami)

Candy

T1 (Te Wo Tsunaginagara)

Wimbledon e Tsureteitte

Kono Mune no Barcode

HW1 (Bunga Matahari)

Itoshisa no defense

Cinderella wa Damasarenai

JSS (Team J B•E•L•I•E•V•E Show)

Classmate

Filmography

Films/Movies 

 Three Day Boys (スリーデイボーイズ) (2009)
 Batsu Game (2010)
 Kusogaki no Kokuhaku (2012)
 Viva JKT48 (2014)

Drama series 

 Majisuka Gakuen (TV Tokyo, 2010)
 Sakura Kara no Tegami: AKB48 Sorezore no Sotugyō Monogatari (NTV, 2011), herself
 Tsuri Keiji 2 "Ai to Kanashimi no Sakana Tachi" (TBS, 2011), Yui Kitasato
 Majisuka Gakuen 2 (TV Tokyo, 2011), as Haruka
 Sabadoru (TV Tokyo, 2012), herself
 BIMA Satria Garuda (RCTI, 2013), Maya
 Onigiri The Series (PocariID/Pocari Sweat Indonesia's YouTube Channel, 2017), as Hana
 Online Offline (Telkomsel/Telkom Digital's YouTube Channel, 2018), as Haruka

Variety Shows 

  ( 5–26 May 2008, Nippon Television)
 AKB48 Nemousu Terebi (Family Gekijo)
 Shukan AKB (10 July 2009 – , not fixed, TV Tokyo)
 AKBingo! (23 December 2009, 6 January, 3–17 March, 2/9 June 2010, Nippon Television)
 Naruhodo! High School (30 May 2010, Nippon Television)
 AKB Kousagi Dojo (17 May 2013)
 JKT48 Mission (23 June 2013 – Hiatus, Trans 7)
 JKT48 Story (31 August 2013 – 2 November 2013, RCTI)
 Ini Sahur (2014–2016, NET.)
 Ini Talkshow (2014–2015, 2017, NET.)
 IClub48 (11 October 2014 – 14 March 2015, NET.)
 Yokoso JKT48 (14 December 2014 – 8 March 2015, ANTV)
 Nippon Keren Deh (29 March 2015 – 21 June 2015, NET.)
 The Ichiban (13 December 2015 – , RTV)
 Baper ! (Frequently invited guest star, RCTI)
 AKB48 Show (5 November dan 17 December 2016, NHK World Premium)
 Rumah Uya (2017, Trans 7)
 Jalan-jalan ke Tohoku dan Hokkaido, Jepang (2017, RTV)
 Lapor Pak! (2021, Trans 7)
 Masakini Masakitu (2022-present, NET.)
 Game Zone Indonesia (2023-present, GTV/Fremantle)

Talkshows 

Ini Talkshow (NET.), as herself
Haruka always made an appearance on NET. TV, and always active since 2014 – Middle 2017

Radio 
TOKYO FM, Talk w/ Nakagawa Haruka & Takahashi Minami, 2016

Commercials 
Pocari Sweat (Otsuka Pharmaceutical Co., Ltd. 大塚製薬株式会社)
YAMAHA (Yamaha Co. ヤマハ株式会社)
Laurier Go with Thin (Kao Corporation 花王株式会社)
Pocky (Ezaki Glico Co., Ltd. 江崎グリコ株式会社)
Bioré (Kao Corporation 花王株式会社)
Lip Ice (Rohto Pharmaceutical Co., Ltd. ロート製薬株式会社)
Rakuten.com (Rakuten, Inc. 楽天株式会社)
IM3 (PT. INDOSAT, Tbk.)
OXY (PT. OXY Indomed)
Tolak Angin (PT. Industri Jamu dan Farmasi Sido Muncul, Tbk,)
CHARM (PT. Uni-Charm Indonesia)
HONDA (Honda Motor Co., Ltd. 本田技研工業株式会社)
Aikatsu! Idol Activity アイカツ! アイドルカツドウ (Bandai Namco Entertainment Inc. 株式会社バンダイナムコゲームスエンターテインメント)
KakaoTalk (Kakao Co. 주식회사 카카오)
WakuWaku Japan (SKY Perfect JSAT Corporation, Inc. 株式会社スカパーJSATホールディングス)
LINE (Line Corporation, Ltd. ライン株式会社)
Ajinomoto 味の素 (Ajinomoto Co., Inc. 味の素株式会社)
Bali Breeze (PT. Dion Farma Abadi, Natasha Group)
Oronamin C Drink (Otsuka Pharmaceutical Co., Ltd. 大塚製薬株式会社)

DVDs 
Other DVD's
Hashire Natsuyasumi (タイトル未定) (with Watarirouka Hashiritai) 2010.10.20

Books

Japan 
 ガパパ! (GaPaPa!) (20 November 2016), 2016 Amazon.jp's Top 10 Best Seller

References

External links 
  
  
  
60 Years Japan – Indonesia homepage 
60 Years Japan – Indonesia homepage 

1992 births
Living people
Japanese women pop singers
21st-century Indonesian women singers
Indonesian pop singers
Indonesian actresses
AKB48 members
JKT48 members
Singers from Tokyo
Japanese expatriates in Indonesia
21st-century Japanese actresses